Maputo International Airport , also known as Mavalane International Airport, formerly Lourenço Marques Airport (IATA: LUM), is an airport located  northwest of the center of Maputo, the largest city and capital of Mozambique. It is the largest airport in Mozambique, and hub for LAM Mozambique Airlines and Kaya Airlines. Most of the destinations served by the airport are in Africa, but there are a few intercontinental services.

Expansion 
China's Anhui Foreign Economic Construction Company has built a new cargo terminal, in what was the starting point of the first phase of a Chinese financed expansion project, with an initial estimated cost of US$75 million. The first phase concluded with the opening of the new international terminal on 15 November 2010. The new terminal has a capacity of 900,000 passengers a year, far from the 60,000 it could hold before. Originally, this modernization project had in mind to benefit from the 2010 FIFA World Cup held in neighbouring South Africa, but it could not be finished in time. It was, however, ready for the All Africa Games which were held in Maputo in 2011. The project experienced a serious cost overrun, with the builder requesting an additional US$40 to US$50 million to complete the work.

The second phase entailed the construction of a new domestic terminal where the old terminal stood. The whole plan is for Maputo International Airport to double its capacity from 450,000 to 900,000 per year and help expand tourism in the city and country. The terminal will also have 14 check-in counters, electronic panels displaying flights, a presidential VIP lounge, escalators and an electric central cooling system. The new terminal is expected to serve 400 arriving and departing passengers per hour, compared to the old building that could only handle 150 passengers per hour.

Airlines and destinations

Passenger

Notes
 : This flight operates via Johannesburg. However, this carrier does not have rights to transport passengers solely between Johannesburg and Maputo.

Cargo

Statistics

Accidents and incidents
On 10 July 1986, Douglas C-47A 7315 of the Zimbabwe Air Force crashed on take-off. All 17 people on board were killed.

References

External links 

 Maputo Airport Information Information website about Maputo Airport.

Airports in Mozambique
Airport